SoCal SC was a men's soccer club based in San Bernardino, CA that competed in the NPSL West Region's Southwest Conference. It ceased operations on 19 July 2017.

Pro Players 
2017 NPSL Roster

Kit manufacturers and jersey sponsors

Coaching Staff

Year-by-year Performance

References

External links
Website 
Facebook 
Twitter 
Instagram 

National Premier Soccer League teams
Soccer clubs in Greater Los Angeles
2015 establishments in California
Association football clubs established in 2015
Association football clubs disestablished in 2017